Haliplus concolor is a species of beetle in the genus Haliplus. It was first described by John Lawrence LeConte in 1852.

References

Haliplidae
Beetles described in 1852